Alchemilla propinqua is a species of flowering plant belonging to the family Rosaceae.

Its native range is Central and Eastern Europe.

References

propinqua